Asalem District is a district (bakhsh) in Talesh County, Gilan Province, Iran. At the 2006 census, its population was 39,089, in 9,203 families.  The District has one city: Asalem.  The District has three rural districts (dehestan): Asalem Rural District, Khaleh Sara Rural District, and Kharajgil Rural District.

References 

Talesh County
Districts of Gilan Province